Tiarella polyphylla is a species of flowering plant in the family Saxifragaceae. The specific name polyphylla means "many-leaved". The species is native to Asia, ranging from the eastern Himalayas to China, east Asia, and southeast Asia. It is sometimes called the Asian foamflower.

Description
Tiarella polyphylla is a perennial, herbaceous plant with a short, slender rhizome. There are two or three smaller leaves on the flowering stem.

Taxonomy
Tiarella polyphylla was described by David Don in 1825. Its type specimen was collected by Nathaniel Wallich in Nepal in 1821. The species is relatively constant in morphology and apparently without synonymy. For a long time it was thought that the two North American species (Tiarella cordifolia and Tiarella trifoliata) were more closely related to each other than to T. polyphylla, but phylogenetic analysis suggests that the latter is more closely related to T. cordifolia than it is to T. trifoliata.

The primary taxonomic source for this species is Flora of China (FoC). , the treatment of Tiarella polyphylla  in FoC is widely recognized.

Distribution
Tiarella polyphylla is an Asian species, ranging from the eastern Himalayas to China, east Asia, and southeast Asia:

 Eastern Himalayas: Nepal, northeast India (Assam, Sikkim), Bhutan, Tibet Autonomous Region
 China: southeastern Gansu, Guangdong, Guangxi, Guizhou, Hubei, Hunan, Jiangxi, southern Shaanxi, Sichuan, southern Xizang, Yunnan
 East Asia: Korea, Japan, Taiwan
 Southeast Asia: northern Myanmar (Burma)

References

Bibliography
 

polyphylla
Flora of Asia
Plants described in 1825
Taxa named by David Don
Flora without expected TNC conservation status